Dualism in cybernetics refers to systems or problems in which one or more intelligent adversaries attempt to exploit the weaknesses of the investigator. Examples could include a game-playing opponent, adversarial law, evolutionary systems of predator/parasite and prey/host, or politics/enslavement attempts.

Background 
Dualism in cybernetics emerged from the notion that there is another form of dualism besides the classical mind-matter dualism and this is the form-matter variant first proposed by the philosopher Anaxagoras and further developed by Plato and Aristotle. Norbert Wiener, the founder of cybernetics, used this as the basis of his position that information is a different reality from matter and energy. In the foundational discipline of cybernetics that he developed, Wiener also drew from the Cartesian dualism, which differentiated non-cognitive body and non-extended/disembodied mind. He outlined a dualism that opposed matter/energy with information and proposed that it is possible for the living and non-living to be within the same wall that once divided them.

Gregory Bateson contributed to the development of this notion of dualism through his theory of mind, which proposed that the mind extends the boundaries of the brain and body so that it is able to take multiple feedback loops, which then creates the link between organisms and the rest of the natural world. The key element here is the concept of feedback, which allows the identification of causal loops so that a system can change its behavior and receive information back from the environment concerning the external changes resulting from that changed behavior, using it as a basis for future actions. This cybernetic idea challenged the traditional subject/object dualism.

Opposition vs complexity 
Wiener contrasted "Manichean devils" (dualistic adversarial systems) with "Augustinian devils"—systems or problems that, though very complex and difficult to figure out, did not feature an adversary with contrary intent. Victories or "expansions of knowledge" in the latter type of system were able to be built upon incrementally, through science (experimentation expanding empirical knowledge bases). Wiener noted that temporary weaknesses (such as errors to perceive all components of a system) were not fatal in attempts to defeat "Augustinian devils" because another experiment could simply be pursued (and he noted that he had personally defeated many "Augustinian devils" with his contributions to science and engineering). By contrast, Wiener observed that temporary lapses in judgment against "Manichean devils" were more often fatal or destructive, due to the desire of the opponent to "win/survive at all costs", even by introducing deception into the system. He said that he had been defeated by many "Manichean devils", such as on occasions when he was temporarily careless in chess.

Although this duality between complexity (in the case of the Augustinian devils) and opposition (in the case of Manichean devils) may seem obvious, it holds deep implications for many areas of science, such as game theory, political science, computer science, network science, security science, military science, evolutionary biology, and cryptography.

References

Cybernetics
Dichotomies